was a Japanese monthly shōnen manga magazine by Kodansha that ran from April 4, 2008 to June 4, 2014. It was issued on the 4th of every month.

As with Shueisha's Jump SQ. and Shogakukan's Monthly Shōnen Sunday, it is aimed at late teens and people in early twenties.

Shōnen Rival was a replacement of the Comic BomBom, which ended in December 2007 due to decline in interest. Shōnen Rival followed the same fate and due to decline in interest the final issue was released on June 4, 2014. Kodansha noted that it was reassessing its manga magazine lineup to aim for more growth, in seek of other success titles like Attack on Titan. To that end, it stop publication on Monthly Shōnen Rival and conducted research for the new magazine that would replace it.

Though most of the series had managed to end by the final issue, all unfinished series were transferred to online platforms such as Manga Box and New Comic Research Institute (新雑誌研究所, Shin Zasshi Kenkyūjō).

Shōnen Rival Series

Reception
Originally in 2008 the magazine started with 300,000 in circulation per month, but due to decline in interest it felt down to 48,000 copies per month in 2013. By 2014, the circulation was 18,000.

References

External links
 Monthly Shōnen Rival website 
 Official Blazer Drive website 

2008 establishments in Japan
2014 disestablishments in Japan
Defunct magazines published in Japan
Monthly manga magazines published in Japan
Kodansha magazines
Magazines established in 2008
Magazines disestablished in 2014
Shōnen manga magazines